Alfred Gottschalk may refer to:
Alfred Gottschalk (biochemist) (1894–1973), glycoprotein researcher
Alfred Gottschalk (rabbi) (1930–2009), President of Hebrew Union College